Personal effects refers to Personal property.

It can also refer to:
Personal Effects (film), a 2008 film